Mikaele Ravalawa (born 9 November 1997) is a Fijian rugby league footballer who plays as a er for the St George Illawarra Dragons in the National Rugby League (NRL) and Fiji at the international level.

Background
Ravalawa was born in Galoa Island, Fiji.

From Galoa Island, Ravalawa originally played rugby union and captained the Fijian Under-18's rugby sevens team.

Playing career

2017–2018
He joined Burnside High School on a scholarship as part of their international rugby programme. He played for the schools first XV and the Crusaders' Under-18 team.

He then switched to rugby league after being spotted by Peter Mulholland, joining the Canberra Raiders in 2017 and played for their Holden Cup (Under-20s) team. That season, Ravalawa scored 12 tries in 22 games and won Canberra's under 20s player of the year award.

He was named in the Fiji squad for the 2017 Rugby League World Cup.

2019
Ravalawa joined the St. George Illawarra Dragons and made 19 appearances for the club during the 2019 NRL season and finished as the club's top try scorer and became a crowd favourite at Kogarah and WIN Stadium.

2020
In 2020, Ravalawa was awarded a penalty try in the club's first match of the season against the Wests Tigers. In that match, he injured his thigh, meaning he could not finish the match and play the next week. In June 2020, Ravalawa re-signed with the club on a three-year deal, keeping him at St. George Illawarra until at least the end of the 2023 season. He ended the season as the club's tied top try-scorer alongside Zac Lomax and Matthew Dufty, scoring 13 tries in the process.

2021
On 27 April, Ravalawa was suspended for two matches after he was initially placed on report for an illegal shoulder charge during the club's loss to the Sydney Roosters in round 7 of the 2021 NRL season.

In round 10 of the 2021 NRL season, Ravalawa scored a hat-trick in the club's 44–18 loss against Melbourne, his first in the NRL. Due to an illegal shoulder charge during this game, he again received a two match suspension.

On 22 June, Ravalawa was suspended for four games by the NRL after being placed on report for an illegal shoulder charge during the club's round 15 victory over Canberra.
In round 24, Ravalawa scored two tries in a 26–38 loss against North Queensland.

2022
During the first round of the 2022 NRL season the St. George Illawarra defeated New Zealand Warriors 28-16 with Ravalawa scoring three tries.
In round 15 of the 2022 NRL season, Ravalawa scored two tries for St. George Illawarra in a 32-12 upset victory over South Sydney.
Ravalawa played 14 games for St. George Illawarra in 2022 as the club finished 10th and missed the finals.

2023
On 21 February, Ravalawa was issued with a breach notice and fined by St. George Illawarra after he was involved in an altercation with teammate Zane Musgrove following the clubs Charity Shield loss to South Sydney in Mudgee. It was alleged that both players were heavily intoxicated after a night out of drinking following the game. It was reported that Ravalawa told club officials he was “too drunk to remember” what happened.

Statistics

References

External links
St. George Illawarra Dragons profile
2017 RLWC profile
Fiji profile

1997 births
Living people
Fijian rugby league players
Fiji national rugby league team players
Fijian rugby sevens players
Fijian rugby union players
Rugby league wingers
Rugby league centres
People educated at Burnside High School
St. George Illawarra Dragons players